The Banner School District is a school district based in El Reno, Oklahoma, United States. It contains a single K-8 school for all students.

See also
List of school districts in Oklahoma

References

External links
 Banner School District
 Banner Overview

School districts in Oklahoma
Education in Canadian County, Oklahoma